Fjällräven (Swedish for 'The Arctic Fox') is a Swedish brand specialising in outdoor equipment—mostly upscale clothing and luggage. It was founded in 1960 by Åke Nordin (1936–2013). The company went public in 1983 with an over-the-counter listing in Stockholm.  Since 2014, Fjällräven has been a subsidiary of Fenix Outdoor International AG, which is listed on the Stockholm Stock Exchange. The group also includes the Tierra, Primus, Hanwag, Brunton, and Royal Robbins brands. The CEO of Fenix as of March 2018 was Martin Nordin, the oldest son of Åke Nordin.

History

At the age of 14, Åke Nordin from Örnsköldsvik in northern Sweden became disappointed with the design of the uncomfortable backpack that he intended to take on a planned hiking trip in the summer of 1950 to Dikanäs, a small community in the Västerbotten mountains.

After undertaking some research, he learned that a pack's weight should be positioned high and close to the wearer's spine. Using his mother's Singer treadle sewing machine, he made a bag out of strong cotton material in his parents' basement. He fastened it to a wooden frame using leather straps with calfskin for the support straps. The frame distributed the load better across his back and increased the ventilation between him and the pack. In addition, he could carry a heavier pack.

Nordin's invention caught the attention of the indigenous Sámi people, one of whom asked Nordin to build him a backpack, and after that a tent.

During his time serving in the Swedish Armed Forces, he realized there was a space in the market for a durable and lightweight backpack. As a result, upon his discharge from the military, he established Fjällräven in 1960 and initially operated out of his family's basement.

In 1983, the company listed itself on the over-the-counter list of the Stockholm Stock Exchange.

By 1996, sales had reached 133 million Swedish kronor (US$20.3 million) of which 71% was from exports.

In 2002, following the purchase of the garment maker Tierra AB and the retail chains Friluftsbolaget AB and Naturkompaniet AB in 2001, the Fjällräven group changed its name to Fenix Outdoor. Fjällräven retained its separate brand identity.

In 2012, Fjällräven opened its first store in New York. In 2013, founder Åke Nordin died at the age of 77.

Fjällräven has a strong market presence in the Nordic countries. It is also represented in other European countries. As of 2017, Fjällräven products are available in over 40 countries.

Products 

Fjällräven means "The Arctic Fox" in Swedish and their products can be identified by their Arctic Fox logo, often found on the left sleeve of their tops and outerwear. The badge itself either follows the outline of the fox logo, or is in a shield-like shape. Most Fjällräven products also possess a small Swedish flag, usually located on a seam.

Fjällräven's original product was the first commercially made external framed backpack. It used an aluminium frame.

In 1968, they introduced the Greenland jacket with polyester-cotton blend G-1000 fabric, which is also used in many other Fjällräven products.

In 1973, they introduced the High Alpine Polar (HAP) sleeping bag which had armholes and drawcord foot openings, which allowed users to walk around in it.

In 1981, they introduced the Gyrosoft, IGF, internal gyro backpack frame.

Today among its more well-known products are Greenland jackets, Vidda Trousers, Expedition Down Jacket, and various versions of the Kånken rucksack.

Most of Fjällräven's products are made from its G-1000 material, released in 1968. This is 65% polyester and 35% cotton. It comes in various types: Original, Silent, Lite and HeavyDuty, each with slightly different properties. G-1000 can be waxed with Fjällräven's Greenland Wax, which can be impregnated with heat applied from a hairdryer, iron or campfire. This affects the water resistance and breathability of the item. Some products come pre-waxed. The process is similar to that of Belstaff wax jackets.

Termo tents
Prior to Fjällräven's entry into the market, most tents were constructed of a single layer of cotton, weighing around  when dry, which then doubled in weight when it got wet. An alternative option was to use a synthetic tent, but these were thin, which allowed moisture to seep through, or so impenetrable that condensation remained on the inside.

Believing that like him users would want to carry as little weight as possible, and not want any equipment inside the tent to get wet, Nordin began to design a solution. In 1964, he brought the Termo tent to the market which combined an outer waterproof flysheet made of a strong, waterproof polyester fabric and a breathable inner tent made from a thin, breathable "Rutarme" polyamide (nylon). This combination allowed moisture to be expelled from the living area before condensing on the inner surface of the flysheet. The tent weighs 1.4 kg (3 lbs).

In 1967, the company launched the Termo G-66 tent.

Greenland jacket and trousers
In 1966, Fjällräven backpacks and Termo condensation-free tents were taken by a number of the members of a research expedition to Greenland to study glaciers. With praises for the Fjällräven equipment, they told Nordin it was unfortunate that the company had not also produced their jackets and trousers, which were made of boiled wool and leather and had proven unsatisfactory. This inspired Nordin to consider entering the clothing segment. He identified that a fabric that had proven too heavy for use in the company's lightweight tents would be durable enough for a jacket, but he needed to find a way of waterproofing it. Remembering that when he was a child at a local ski jump with his friends, they had prevented the snow from soaking through their trousers by rubbing the wax meant for their skis onto the fabric, he began experimenting with different wax solutions. He eventually developed a solution of paraffin and beeswax which he then applied to the fabric with the help of his wife's hairdryer.

The finished jacket which entered the market in 1968 was called the Greenland Jacket, while the fabric in time became known as G-1000, and the beeswax and paraffin mixture was sold as Greenland Wax.

In 1970, the company introduced the Greenland Trousers using the G-1000 material previously used in the Greenland jacket.

Fjällräven Kånken

The Fjällräven Kånken is Fjällräven's best-selling product. It was originally developed as a reaction to a 1977 study of increasing number of reports that Swedish school children were developing back problems from their more traditional bags. The lightweight and rectangular yet spacious backpack, which was released in 1978, was Fjällräven's attempt to solve this problem.

In 1977, Fjällräven made prototypes of the "Kånken" and gave it to some kids in Sweden to test it out.

During its first year in production, 400 were sold, increasing to 30,000 the following year. As of April 2018, Fjällräven sells the Kånken in 54 different colours.

By 2008, over three million Kånken daypacks had been produced, with 200,000 being made each year.

The range has expanded to include the Mini-Kånken with a capacity of 7 litres released in 2002 for preschoolers. The Kånken Laptop, released in 2006 with a back pocket for a laptop and paddled selves. The Re-Kånken, released in 2016 and made entirely of polyester from recycled plastic bottles and the Tree-Kånken, released in 2021, and it's made from Pine Weave, a unique fabric produced using more sustainable methods from certified Swedish trees grown close to Fjällräven’s hometown of Örnsköldsvik.

It is now sold worldwide, and is most popular with young people aged 12-25. Kånkens have a different logo to most other Fjällräven products, which are white and pink as opposed to the usual light brown colour. The Kånken was awarded the Guldknappen Accessoar design prize in 2018.

Sponsorship

Fjällräven Polar

In the early 1990s, Åke Nordin met Kenth Fjellborg, one of Sweden's leading dog-sled drivers. Fjellborg had participated in Iditarod, the world's most difficult dog sled competition through the harsh Alaskan wilderness: so Nordin decided to create a Swedish equivalent. In 1997, Fjällräven Polar took place in the Scandinavian Arctic for the first time.

The event also provides an opportunity for Fjällräven to test out clothes, tents and other equipment in the environment they were made for: the winter wilderness of northern Scandinavia.

Fjällräven Classic

Wishing to encourage and enable more people to get out and enjoy trekking, Åke Nordin at the start of the 21st century came up with the concept behind the Fjällräven Classic. It is not a competition or a race, but a chance to socialise with other hikers and enjoy the trek of a lifetime. There were just 152 finishers at the first Swedish Classic in 2005 and by 2015 there were 2,136 finishers.  Fjällräven Classic now takes place in six different locations around the world: Sweden, Denmark, the US, the UK, South-Korea and Germany.

Fjällräven Center

For many years, Nordin supported his hometown of Örnsköldsvik's Modo Hockey professional ice hockey club. In November 2009, Fjällräven acquired the naming rights to the club's home arena, which from January 2010 until August 2021 was called the Fjällräven Center.

References

External links

 Fjällräven
 Fjällräven Srbija - The official distributor of the Swedish brand Fjallraven in Serbia.

Ångermanland
Camping equipment manufacturers
Clothing brands of Sweden
Clothing companies established in 1960
Clothing companies of Sweden
Outdoor clothing brands
Purveyors to the Court of Sweden
Swedish brands
Swedish companies established in 1960
Companies based in Solna Municipality